Piozzo is a comune (municipality) in the Province of Cuneo in the Italian region Piedmont, located about  south of Turin and about  northeast of Cuneo.

Piozzo borders the following municipalities: Bene Vagienna, Carrù, Farigliano, and Lequio Tanaro.

Demographic evolution

References

Cities and towns in Piedmont